Of Love and Shadows, also known as De amor y de sombra, is a 1994 Chilean-Argentine-American drama film written and directed by Betty Kaplan and starring Antonio Banderas, Jennifer Connelly, Stefania Sandrelli and Patricio Contreras. It is based on the 1984 novel of the same name by Isabel Allende.

Plot    
Irene is a magazine editor living under the shadow of the Pinochet dictatorship in Chile. Francisco is a handsome photographer and he comes to Irene for a job. As a sympathizer with the underground resistance movement, Francisco opens her eyes and her heart to the atrocities being committed by the state.

Cast 
 Antonio Banderas as Francisco
 Jennifer Connelly as Irene
 Stefania Sandrelli as Beatriz
 Diego Wallraff as José
 Camilo Gallardo as Gustavo
 Patricio Contreras as Mario
 Jorge Rivera López as Prof. Leal
 Jacques Arndt as The General

Reception
The film had almost 300,000 admissions in Argentina during 1995.

References

External links 
 
 
 

1994 films
1994 drama films
Argentine drama films
American drama films
Films directed by Betty Kaplan
Films shot in Buenos Aires
Films set in Chile
Films about the Chilean military dictatorship
Miramax films
1990s English-language films
1990s American films
1990s Argentine films